List of compositions for accordion and string quartet. 
Composers started writing music for this special combination in the second half of the twentieth century.

A 
Alain Abbott (1938)
Simples Melodies...: 4 pièces très faciles pour accordéon de concert et quatuor à cordes (1979)
Hans Abrahamsen (1952)
Three Little Nocturnes (2005)
Sergey Akhunov (1967)
Two Keys to one Brodsky's poem
Franck Angelis
Étude sur le thème Chiquilín de Bachín
Valéry Arzoumanov (1944)
Quintette (2013)
Dirk d'Ase (1960)
Burning Day (1995)

B 
Zbigniew Bargielski (1937)
Noc pożegnań na akordeon i kwartet smyczkowy (1983) "Abschiedsnacht"
(Revised version premiered on March 13, 1996, by Georg Schulz (Wiener Konzerthaus, Vienna, AT))
Vidmantas Bartulis (1954)
We sing reservedly in the presence of the unknown... (2008)
Jürg Baur (1918-2010)
Concerto für Mixtur-Trautonium und Streichquartett, Fassung für Akkordeon(1956/1987)
Franck Bedrossian (1971)
I lost a world the other day (2016)
Robert Russell Bennett (1894/1981)
Quintet (Psychiatry) for accordion and string quartet	(1963)
Bernard van Beurden (1933-2016)
A-vier (2009)	 
Joseph Biviano
Quintet in G	
Marcin Błażewicz (1953)
Can you hear them? - Shadows of Memory for accordion and string quartet (2001)
Jack Body (1944-2015)
Saetas (2003/05)
Edward Bogusławski (1940-2003) 
Impromptu II A for string quartet and accordion (1999)
Marcin Bortnowski (1972)
Music in lent (2000) 
Mikhail Bronner (1952)
1812 Capriccio for bayan and string quartet (2012) 
Seven Yiddish Songs for bayan and string quartet (version) (2014) 
Walter Buczynski (1933)
Projection for accordion and string quartet (1978)

C 
Cesare Chiacchiaretta (1973)
 Anemos (2017)
Mary Ellen Childs (1957)
Four of One of Another (1988)
Wiesław Cienciała (1961 )
Variants n° 2 [version II] for accordion and string quartet (1996)
Vladislav Cojocaru (1983)
Harlequin (2016)
Torero

D 
Fridolin Dallinger (1933)
Quintet for accordion and string quartet (2009)
Gary Daverne (1939)
Concert Waltz (1993)
Đeni Dekleva-Radaković (1949 )
Kvintet
Robert Denhof (1945)
Concertino für Bajan/Akkordeon und Streichquartett oder Streichorchester op. 139 (2012)
Henryk Derus (1959)
Euphõnia (1996)
Jean-Louis Dhaine (1949 - 2006)
Night music
David Diamond (1915 - 2005) 
Night music (1961)
Snieguolė Dikčiūtė (1966)
Arcade (2008)
Violeta Dinescu (1953)
All´ombra del tiempo (1995)
Miro Dobrowolny (1959) 
Pavane (2009)
Doderer, Johanna (1969)
Heidekrautwalzer für Akkordeon und Streichquartett

E 
Simon Eastwood (1985)
Magnetic Lines (2015)

F 
Markus Fagerudd (1961)
Wilma sarja (2007)
Ivan Fedele (1953)
Deystviya (2011)
Günter Friedrichs (1935)
Storie e colori (1988/89)

G 
Pascal Gaigne (1958)
Avant la nuit (2003)
Vytautas Germanavičius (1969)
Black Shadows - White Shadows (2008)
Aaron Gervais (1980)
Four Pieces for Accordion and String Quartet (2003)
Jani Golob (1948)
Concertino for accordion & string quartet (2012)
Gerardo Gozzi (1988)
Spazi della memoria di un vecchio (2015)
Herbert Grassl (1948)
Cinque incontri (1995)
Eric Gross (1926-2011)
Concert fantasia, op. 252 (2001)

H 
Pouya Hamidi (1986)
Three Reflections on Empathy (2015)
Gorka Hermosa
Gernika, 26/4/1937 (1994)
Anantango (2003/15)
Bertold Hummel (1925-2002)
Tripartita opus 85a (1986)
Veikko Huuskonen (1930)
Kesäsarja (version 1) (2000)
Asko Hyvärinen (1963)
Ehiknosdeux (2000)

J 
David Johnstone
Sonata de Cámara" (Mar del plata), for Accordion and String Quartet (2003)
Ralf Jung
As-Musik

K 
Ben Kahmann (1914-2002)
Rhapsodium
Shigeru Kan-no (1959)
Pro-Concerto-Grosso WVE 168-b for Accordion and String Quartet(2000)
Friedrich Keil (1957)
Drei Referenzen (2004)
Johannes Kern (1965)
Happy birthday to me (1996)
Hannes Kerschbaumer (1981)
abbozzo V for quartertone-accordion and string quartet (2014)
Jouni Kesti (1946)
Jounikvintetto (2011)
Nikola Kołodziejczyk (1986)
Subliminal Folk Suite
Jo Kondo (1947)
Yarrow (2005)
Włodzimierz Korcz (1943)
07 zgłoś się (2013)
Przemysław Książek (1976)
Concerto breve n° 2 for accordion and string quartet
Obsessio
Veli Kujala (1976)
Friixi (2006)
Mixi for quartertone-accordion and string quartet (2011)
Ladislav Kupkovič (1936-2016)
Quintet for Accordion and String Quartet (2005)

L 
Hope Lee (1953)
Fei Yang (2000)
Krzysztof Lenczowski
Atom Accordion Quintet
Martin Lichtfuss (1959)
K*tzbühel - eine Patriotische Huldigung (2008)
Martin Lohse (1971)
Concerto in tempi (2012)
Grégoire Lorieux (1976)
Description du blanc (b) (2011) 
I-Tsen Lu
Jenseits, im ungewissen (1996) 
Ray Luedeke (1944)
Tango Dreams, for accordion and string trio
Torbjörn Lundquist
Bewegungen (1966)

M 
Andrew Paul MacDonald (1958)
Winds of Thera op. 44 (1997)
Teisutis Makačinas (1938)
Arcade (2008)
Mikołaj Majkusiak (1983)
up2U
Javier Torres Maldonado
Luz (2000)
Miklós Maros (1943)
Quintetto mantice for Accordion and String Quartet (2012)
David Mastikosa (1992)
 Dimensio for accordion and string quartet (2017)
Dominic Matthews
Dvasia (2018)
Chiel Meijering (1954)
Spinning out (1989)
Michał Moc (1977)
Accordella (2000)
Eric Morin (1969)
In Praise of Folly (2010)
Staffan Mossenmark (1961)
Kraftspiel (1991)
Aures Kabir Moussong
Sama (2013)
Marian Mozetich (1948)
Hymn of ascension, original version for harmonium and string quartet
Massimo Munari (1976)
Esar II (2016)
Benjamin de Murashkin (1981)
Microcosm (2016)
Matti Murto (1947)
Kvintetto (2007)
Peter Mutter (1992)
Impuls (2015)

N 
Aspasia Nasopoulou (1972)
Perivoli (2013)
Daniel Nelson (1965)
My inner disco (2002)
Jon Øivind Ness (1968)
Spoof Spiral 2 : for accordion and string quartet (2001)
James Nightingale (accordionist) (1948)
Cantillations
Patrick Nunn (1969)
Escape-velocity (2006)

O 
Krzysztof Olczak (1956)
Angels of Darkness (version 2) (2002)
Jan Oleszkowicz (1947)
Tzigane koncert (2000) 
Sławomir Olszamowski (1953) 
Quintet 144 MM. for accordion and string quartet (1999)
Esa Onttonen (1975)
Kiduspoika Janus (2002)

P 
Jaime Padrós (1926-2007) 
Epigrafos sonorizados (1986)
Klaus Paier (1966)
invencíon 1998 for accordion & string quartet (1998)
scenes (2006)
tres sentimientos (2006)
three + four (2006)
Theodor Pauß (1969)
Noch einmal, in alle Ewigkeit! (2000) 
Barbara Pentland (1912-2000) 
Interplay (1972)
Carlos Peron-Cano (1976)
Natura Celestis (version 2)
Matthias Pintscher (1971)
Figura I (1998)
Astor Piazzolla
Five Tango Sensations for bandoneón & string quartet (1989)
Efrem Podgaits (1949)
Ex animo (2003)
Kimmo Pohjonen (1964)
Uniko (2004), CD Project with Kronos Quartet (2011)
Gene Pritsker (1971)
Revisited Residue (2017)
Donatas Prusevičius (1966)
Storm (2004)
Bronisław Kazimierz Przybylski (1941-2011)
Metamorphosen für Akkordeon und Streichquartett (1985)
From the Life triptych for accordion and string quartet (2000)
Night Birds (version 3) for accordion and string quartet (2007)
Kazimierz Pyzik (1955)
Halucynacja n° 4 (1999)

R 
Osmo Tapio Räihälä (1964)
De-cadenza (2005)
Maja Solveig Kjelstrup Ratkje (1973)
Gagaku variations (2001) 
Werner Richter (1929-2008)
Musik über ein böhmisches Volkslied (1980)
Wolfgang Rihm (1952)
Fetzen 3, 5, 6, 7, 8 (2002)
Aldemaro Romero (1928-2007)
Five Paleontological Mysteries: I. Fossils; II. Lizards; III. Jelly Fishes; IV. Paleocyphonates; V. Ubos (2005)
Richard Romiti (1943)
Serenade (1979)
Nick Roth (1982)
Second Quintet (2019)
Bernhard Rövenstrunck (1920)
Adaptationen (1969)
Poul Ruders (1949)
Serenade on the shores of the Cosmic Ocean (2005)

S 
Jorge Torres Sáenz (1968)
Primera intempestiva (2018)
Jacek Sajka (1961)
Noumenon (1999)
Jan Sandström (1954)
Strange Matter (1985) 
Gerwin Schmucker
Orbit 
Patrice Sciortino (1922)
Improvvisatura (2013)
Gabriel Sivak (1979)
Nadando en la nada (2008)
Ylva Skog (1963)
Trote (2018-2019) 
Bent Sørensen (1958)
Dancers and Disappearance (2018)
Martin Stauning (1982)
Where We Are There Is No Here (2014)
Robert Stiegler (1959)
Parlando, a fantasy with four in one
Nicolaas van Straten
Curven (1970)
Józef Świder (1930)
Suite im alten Stil (1979)

T 
Rob Teehan 
Wistful thinking (2010)
Sara Torquati (1961)
Puer Natus (2003)
Javier Torres-Maldonado (1968)
Lux (2001)
Pavel Trojan (1956)
Ballet scenes (2011)
Jan Truhlář (1928 - 2007)
Scherzo (version 1) (1968)
Sentence (2002)

U 
Raimonds Ungurs
Malda (Prayer) (2015)

V 
Gunnar Valkare (1943)
Taang (2001) 
EX (2002)
Anna Veismane (1979)
Why me? (version 2) (2010)
Francesca Verunelli (1979)
Luminal (2007)

W 
Adrian Williams (1956)
Quintet (1996)
James Wilson (1922–2005)
Quintet for Accordion and Strings Op. 22 (1967)
Helena Winkelman (1974)
Tides-Sedit (2010)
Tomas Winter (1954)
Gömställen (2002/03)
Piotr Wróbel
Suita 3 5 7
Gerhard Wuensch (1925-2007)
Music without Pretensions, Opus 45 (1969)
Zdzislaw Wysocki (1944)
Quintettino - für Akkordeon und Streichquartett (1994)

Y 
Aliaksandr Yasinski
Peace (Мір) (2015)
 
Isang Yun (1917-1995)
Concertino (1983)

Z 
Franck Zabel (1968)
Danse disparue (2012)

Sources

 Aut|C. Jacomucci (ed.): Critical selection of accordion works composed between 1990 and 2010. Loreto: Edizioni Tecnostampa, 2014. .
 RIM Repertoire lists volume 8 accordion, Utrecht 1990 (Repertoire Informatie Centrum)
 

List of compositions for accordion and string quartet
 
Accordion and string quartet
Accordion and string quartet
Contemporary music